Louis "Studs" Terkel (May 16, 1912 – October 31, 2008) was an American writer, historian, actor, and broadcaster. He received the Pulitzer Prize for General Non-Fiction in 1985 for The Good War and is best remembered for his oral histories of common Americans, and for hosting a long-running radio show in Chicago.

Early life
Terkel was born to Russian Jewish immigrants, Samuel Terkel, a tailor, and Anna (Annie) Finkel, a seamstress, in New York City. At the age of eight, he moved with his family to Chicago, Illinois, where he spent most of his life. He had two brothers, Meyer (1905–1958) and Ben (1907–1965).  He attended McKinley High School.

From 1926 to 1936, his parents ran a rooming house that also served as a meeting place for people from all walks of life. Terkel credited his understanding of humanity and social interaction to the tenants and visitors who gathered in the lobby there and the people who congregated in nearby Bughouse Square.

In 1939, he married Ida Goldberg (1912–1999), and the couple had one son. Although he received his undergraduate degree in 1932 and a J.D. degree from the University of Chicago in 1934 (and was admitted to the Illinois Bar the following year), he decided that, instead of practicing law, he wanted to be a concierge at a hotel, and he soon joined a theater group.

Career
A political leftist, Terkel joined the Works Progress Administration's Federal Writers' Project, working in radio, doing work that varied from voicing soap opera productions and announcing news and sports to presenting shows of recorded music and writing radio scripts and advertisements. In the late 1940's he voiced characters in WMAQ's Destination Freedom series. His own well-known radio program, titled The Studs Terkel Program, aired on 98.7 WFMT Chicago between 1952 and 1997. The one-hour program was broadcast each weekday during those 45 years. On this program, he interviewed guests as diverse as Martin Luther King Jr., Leonard Bernstein, Mort Sahl, Bob Dylan, Alexander Frey, Dorothy Parker, Tennessee Williams, Jean Shepherd, Frank Zappa, and Big Bill Broonzy.

In the late 1940s and early 1950s, Terkel was also the central character of Studs' Place, an unscripted television drama about the owner of a greasy-spoon diner in Chicago through which many famous people and interesting characters passed. This show, Marlin Perkins's Zoo Parade, Garroway at Large, and the children's show Kukla, Fran, and Ollie are widely considered canonical examples of the Chicago School of Television.

Terkel published his first book, Giants of Jazz, in 1956. He followed it in 1967 with his first collection of oral histories, Division Street America, with 70 people talking about the effect on the human spirit of living in an American metropolis.

He also served as a distinguished scholar-in-residence at the Chicago History Museum. He appeared in the film Eight Men Out, based on the Black Sox Scandal, in which he played newspaper reporter Hugh Fullerton, who tries to uncover the White Sox players' plans to throw the 1919 World Series. Terkel found it particularly amusing to play this role, as he was a big fan of the Chicago White Sox (as well as a vocal critic of major league baseball during the 1994 baseball strike), and gave a moving congratulatory speech to the White Sox organization after their 2005 World Series championship during a television interview.

Terkel received his nickname while he was acting in a play with another person named Louis. To keep the two straight, the director of the production gave Terkel the nickname Studs after the fictional character about whom Terkel was reading at the time—Studs Lonigan, of James T. Farrell's trilogy.

Terkel was acclaimed for his efforts to preserve American oral history. His 1985 book "The Good War": An Oral History of World War Two, which detailed ordinary peoples' accounts of the country's involvement in World War II, won the Pulitzer Prize. For Hard Times: An Oral History of the Great Depression, Terkel assembled recollections of the Great Depression that spanned the socioeconomic spectrum, from Okies, through prison inmates, to the wealthy. His 1974 book, Working, in which (as reflected by its subtitle) People Talk About What They Do All Day and How They Feel About What They Do, also was highly acclaimed. Working was made into a short-lived Broadway show of the same title in 1978 and was telecast on PBS in 1982. In 1995, he received the Chicago History Museum "Making History Award" for Distinction in Journalism and Communications. In 1997, Terkel was elected a member of The American Academy of Arts and Letters. Two years later, he received the George Polk Career Award in 1999.

Later life

In 2004, Terkel received the Elijah Parish Lovejoy Award as well as an honorary Doctor of Laws degree from Colby College. In August 2005, Terkel underwent successful open-heart surgery. At the age of 93, he was one of the oldest people to undergo this form of surgery and doctors reported his recovery to be remarkable for someone of that advanced age. Terkel smoked two cigars a day until 2004.

On May 22, 2006, Terkel, along with other plaintiffs, including Quentin Young, filed suit in federal district court against AT&T Inc., to stop the telecommunications carrier from giving customer telephone records to the National Security Agency without a court order.

The lawsuit was dismissed by Judge Matthew F. Kennelly on July 26, 2006. Judge Kennelly cited a "state secrets privilege" designed to protect the government from being harmed by lawsuits.

In an interview in The Guardian celebrating his 95th birthday, Terkel discussed his own "diverse and idiosyncratic taste in music, from Bob Dylan to Alexander Frey, Louis Armstrong to Woody Guthrie".

Terkel published a new personal memoir entitled Touch and Go in fall 2007.

Terkel was a self-described agnostic, which he jokingly defined as "a cowardly atheist" during a 2004 interview with Krista Tippett on American Public Media's Speaking of Faith.

One of his last interviews was for the documentary Soul of a People on Smithsonian Channel. He spoke about his participation in the Works Progress Administration.

At his last public appearance, in 2007, Terkel said he was "still in touch—but ready to go". He gave one of his last interviews on the BBC HARDtalk program on February 4, 2008. He spoke of the imminent election of Barack Obama as President of the United States, and offered him some advice, in October 2008.

Terkel died in his Chicago home on Friday, October 31, 2008, at the age of 96. He had been suffering since a fall in his home earlier that month.

Legacy and audio recordings

In 1998, Terkel and WFMT, the radio station which broadcast Terkel's long-running program, donated approximately 7,000 tape recordings of Terkel's interviews and broadcasts to the Chicago History Museum.

In 2010, the Chicago History Museum and the Library of Congress announced a multi-year joint collaboration to digitally preserve and make available at both institutions these recordings, which the Library of Congress called, "a remarkably rich history of the ideas and perspectives of both common and influential people living in the second half of the 20th century." "For Studs, there was not a voice that should not be heard, a story that could not be told," said Gary T. Johnson, Museum president. "He believed that everyone had the right to be heard and had something important to say. He was there to listen, to chronicle, and to make sure their stories are remembered."

In 2014 WFMT and the Chicago History Museum announced the creation of the website, Studsterkel.org (see studsterkel.wfmt.com), which will house the entire archive of Studs Terkel interviews.

On September 5, 2019, podcast The Radio Diaries, produced by Radiotopia on PRX, released an episode called "The Working Tapes of Studs Terkel." In it, Terkel's taped interviews with working people are played and examined.

Awards and honors
In 1982, Terkel was awarded an honorary Doctor of Humane Letters from the University of Illinois at Chicago.

In 1985, Terkel received the Pulitzer Prize for General Non-Fiction for his book The Good War.

President Clinton awarded Terkel the National Humanities Medal in 1997.

The National Book Foundation awarded Terkel the 1997 Medal for Distinguished Contribution to American Letters.

In 2001, Terkel was made an honorary Doctor of Humane Letters from Northwestern University.

In 2001, Terkel was inducted into the Chicago Gay and Lesbian Hall of Fame as a Friend of the Community.

In 2004, Terkel was inducted as a Laureate of The Lincoln Academy of Illinois and awarded the Order of Lincoln (the State's highest honor) by the Governor of Illinois in the area of Communications.

In 2006, Terkel received the Lifetime Achievement Award from the Dayton Literary Peace Prize, the first and only annual U.S. literary award recognizing the power of the written word to promote peace.

In 2010, Terkel was inducted into the Chicago Literary Hall of Fame.

Terkel was a recipient of a George Polk Career Award and the National Book Critics Circle 2003 Ivan Sandrof Lifetime Achievement Award.

Terkel, despite not being black, was inducted into the Hall of Fame of Black Writers at the insistence of Haki Madhubuti.

Selected works

Articles
 "Servants of the State: Speaking truth to power: an interview with Daniel Ellsberg, Tony Russo  and Eqbab Ahmed." Harper's Magazine, vol. 244, no. 1461 (Feb. 1972), pp. 52+.
 "Women at Work." Ramparts Magazine (Apr. 1974), pp. 38–44.

Books
 Giants of Jazz (1957). 
 Division Street: America (1967), 
 Hard Times: An Oral History of the Great Depression (1970), 
 Working: People Talk About What They Do All Day and How They Feel About What They Do (1974). 
 Talking to Myself: A Memoir of My Times (1973, reprinted 1977), 
 American Dreams: Lost and Found (1983), 
 The Good War (1984), 
 Chicago (1986), 
 The Great Divide: Second Thoughts on the American Dream (1988), 
 Race: What Blacks and Whites Think and Feel About the American Obsession (1992), 
 Coming of Age: The Story of Our Century by Those Who've Lived It (1995), 
 My American Century (1997), 
 The Spectator: Talk About Movies and Plays With Those Who Make Them (1999), 
 Will the Circle Be Unbroken: Reflections on Death, Rebirth and Hunger for a Faith (2001), 
 Hope Dies Last: Keeping the Faith in Difficult Times (2003), 
 And They All Sang: Adventures of an Eclectic Disc Jockey (2005), 
 Touch and Go (2007), 
 P.S. Further Thoughts from a Lifetime of Listening (2008),

References

External links

 
 
 
 
  in 1985
 
 Portrait of Louis "Studs" Terkel seated at a restaurant table in Los Angeles, California, 1970. Los Angeles Times Photographic Archive (Collection 1429). UCLA Library Special Collections, Charles E. Young Research Library, University of California, Los Angeles.

1912 births
2008 deaths
20th-century American historians
20th-century American male writers
20th-century American memoirists
21st-century American male writers
21st-century American non-fiction writers
Accidental deaths from falls
American agnostics
American male journalists
American male non-fiction writers
American people of Russian-Jewish descent
American radio journalists
Culture of Chicago
Elijah Parish Lovejoy Award recipients

Federal Writers' Project people

Historians of the United States

Jazz writers
Jewish agnostics
Jewish American male actors
Jewish American writers
Members of the American Academy of Arts and Letters
National Humanities Medal recipients
Oral historians
Pulitzer Prize winners
Pulitzer Prize for General Non-Fiction winners
Radio personalities from Chicago
University of Chicago Law School alumni
Vaudeville performers
Writers from Chicago